Sir Edward Baines (28 May 1800 – 2 March 1890), also known as Edward Baines Jr, was a nonconformist English newspaper editor and Member of Parliament (MP).

Biography
Edward Baines, of St Ann's Hill, Leeds, was the second son (and biographer) of Edward Baines (1774–1848), proprietor of the Leeds Mercury and MP for Leeds in the 1830s, and his wife Charlotte Talbot. His elder brother, Matthew Talbot Baines, was also a politician.

Edward Baines junior was educated at a Leeds private school and then at a dissenting academy – the Leaf Square grammar school at Pendleton, near Manchester, alongside his lifelong friend John Peele Clapham. From 1815 he worked as a journalist on the Leeds Mercury (in which capacity he was an eye-witness of the Peterloo massacre), becoming a junior editor c 1820 and a partner in the business in 1827. He became sole editor when his father was elected to Parliament in 1834,  and, after his father's death in 1848, proprietor of the Leeds Mercury. He served as Liberal MP for Leeds from 1859 to 1874. He was knighted in 1880.

A political Liberal, he supported the 1832 Reform Act and the 1834 new poor laws; he was an advocate of repeal of the corn laws and of the separation of church and state. He was an opponent of the factory reform movement and responsible for the Mercurys rejection of Richard Oastler's letters to it on the subject. A staunch Dissenter, he opposed state-sponsored education (because it was unthinkable that education should be purely secular, but also unconscionable that the state should have any involvement with religious instruction).

In 1843 he wrote in the Mercury that education was something individuals could do for themselves "under the guidance of natural instinct and self-interest, infinitely better than Government could do for them".  Hence "All Government interference to COMPEL Education is wrong" and had unacceptable implications: "If Government has a right to compel Education, it has right to compel RELIGION !" He withdrew his opposition in the 1860s, when he reluctantly conceded the inadequacy of efforts for the voluntary provision of education. In the 1860s he repeatedly introduced bills to widen the franchise; all were defeated.

Baines helped to found the Leeds Literary and Philosophical Society. He was also a prominent advocate of working-class adult education, founding Yorkshire Mechanics' Institutes in imitation of George Birkbeck's London mechanics' institute.   Contributions of his on the cotton industry to his father's History of Lancashire were praised by reviewers; at their suggestion his History of the Cotton Manufacture was published separately with much additional material (1835). He celebrated the natural position and the political advantages of English commerce and manufacturing districts, and especially of the English navy which "held the sovereignty of the ocean, and under its protection the commerce of this country extended beyond all former bounds, and established a firm connexion between the manufacturers of Lancashire and their customers in the most distant lands."

Baines also wrote a number of more polemical works; e.g. criticisms of Owenism. In 1840 he attended the World's Anti-Slavery Convention where he was captured in a group painting.

He married Martha Blackburn in 1829.

Baines died on 2 March 1890 in Leeds, and was interred in the family vault at Woodhouse Cemetery.

Works

See also
Charles Reed, educationalist and MP, married Edward Baines's sister Margaret
Edward Crossley, of Halifax, carpet-manufacturer, astronomer and MP, married Edward Baines's third daughter, Jane Eleanor

References

Sources

External links 

 

1800 births
1890 deaths
Church of England disestablishment
Liberal Party (UK) MPs for English constituencies
Politicians from Leeds
English newspaper editors
English male journalists
UK MPs 1859–1865
UK MPs 1865–1868
UK MPs 1868–1874
19th-century British journalists